Baldwin River may refer to:

 Baldwin River (Isle of Man), a tributary of the River Glass
 Baldwin River (Michigan), a tributary of the Pere Marquette River

See also 
 Baldwin (disambiguation)